Yeren (野人) may refer to:
 Yeren, legendary hybrid beast-man of Hubei Province, China
 Yeren (Zhou), "people of the fields" as opposed to guoren, cultured people of the Zhou period settlements